While slavery has not been widespread on the territory of what is now Russia since the introduction of Christianity in the tenth century, serfdom in Russia, which was in many ways similar to contemporary slavery around the world, only ended in February 19th, 1861 when Russian Emperor Alexander II issued The Emancipation of the serfs in 1861. Emancipation of state-owned serfs occurred in 1866.

The Russian term  ( is usually translated as "serf": an unfree person who, unlike a slave, can only be sold with the land they are "attached" to.

The 2018 Global Slavery Index estimates 794,000 people currently living in slavery-like conditions in Russia. This includes forced labor, forced prostitution, debt bondage, forced servile marriage, exploitation of children, and forced prison labor.

History
In Kievan Rus' and Muscovy, legal systems usually referred to a special type of serfs as kholopy. Individuals could become kholop as a result of capture, selling themselves, being sold for debts, committing crimes, or marriage to a kholop. Until the late 10th century, the kholopy represented a majority among the servants who worked lords' lands. The power a kholop's master had over his life varied over the centuries. This power then slowly began to degrade during the next centuries with reforms of Alexei Mikhailovich and Peter the Great.

The Russian lands continued in their historic function as a source of slaves for outsiders.
For example, in 1382 the Golden Horde under Khan Tokhtamysh sacked Moscow, burning the city and carrying off thousands of inhabitants as slaves; similar raids occurred routinely until well into the 16th century. In 1521, the combined forces of Crimean Khan Mehmed I Giray and his Kazan allies attacked Moscow and captured thousands of slaves. In 1571, the Crimean Tatars attacked and sacked Moscow, burning everything but the Kremlin and taking thousands of captives as slaves. In Crimea, about 75% of the population consisted of slaves. The Crimean–Nogai raids into East Slavic lands continued into the 18th century.

An anonymous Lithuanian author wrote in De moribus tartarorum, lituanorum et moscorum: 

By the sixteenth century, the slave population of the Grand Duchy of Moscow consisted mostly of those who had had become serfs owing to poverty. They worked predominantly as household servants, among the richest families, and indeed generally produced less than they consumed. Laws forbade slave owners to free slaves in times of famine in order to avoid feeding them, and slaves generally remained with their owning family for a long time; the Domostroy, an advice book, speaks of the need to choose slaves of good character and to provide for them properly. Slavery remained a major institution in Russia until 1723, when Peter the Great converted the household slaves into house serfs.  The government of Tsar Feodor III had formally converted Russian agricultural slaves into serfs earlier, in 1679.

Indigenous peoples of Siberia – notably the Yakuts and the Buryats of Eastern Siberia – practised slavery on a small scale. With the conquest of Siberia in the 16th and 17th centuries, Russians enslaved natives in military operations and in Cossack raids. Cases involving native women were frequent, held as concubines, sometimes mortgaged to other men and traded for commercial profit. The Russian government generally opposed the conversion of natives to Christianity because it would free them from paying the yasak, the fur tribute. The government decreed that the non-Christian slaves were to be freed. This in turn led local Russian owners of slaves to petition the government for conversion and even involved forced conversions of their slaves. The rules stipulated that the native convert became a serf of the converter. As an indication of the extent of the slavery system, one voyevoda reported in 1712 that "there is hardly a Cossack in Yakutsk who does not have natives as slaves".

Russian conquest of the Caucasus led to the abolition of slavery by the 1860s and the conquest of the Central Asian Islamic khanates of Bukhara, Samarkand, and Khiva by the 1870s. A notorious slave market for captured Russian and Persian slaves was centred in the Khanate of Khiva from the 17th to the 19th century. At the beginning of the 21st century Chechens and Ingush kept Russian captives as slaves or in slave-like conditions in the mountains of the northern Caucasus.

Current situation
Internal migrants from Russia’s poorer regions and foreign migrants are reportedly trafficked (sometimes involving drugging and kidnapping) and then forced to work against their will in brick factories and small farms in Dagestan. Many of Russia’s migrant workers are irregular migrants, a status that makes them particularly vulnerable to modern slavery.

Recent (2009–2012) reports have identified human trafficking and slavery of Uzbek nationals in contemporary Russian society.

See also

References

Economic history of Russia
Legal history of Russia
Russia
Social history of Russia
Slavery in Europe
Slavery in Asia
Human rights abuses in Russia